Lucerna is a Czech fairy-tale play based on a theme of writer Alois Jirásek. The stage play Lucerna, in four acts, was written by Alois Jirásek in 1905. It premiered on 17 November 1905 in National Theatre in Prague. The play was a best-seller.

Story 
 
Libor, a miller, lives in his mill with his grandmother and foster daughter Hanka. A waterman, Michal, who lives nearby, is in love with Hanka In an old mill lives a miller Libor with his grandmother and foster-daughter Hanka. In the mill lives an old waterman, Ivan.

Productions

State Castle and Chateau, Jindřichův Hradec 
Directed by Josef Nechutný
Young Princess .... Andrea Černá
Gentleman .... Bohumil Čížek
Suzerain .... Viktor Vrabec
Miller .... Vlastimil Hanuš
Granny .... Květa Máchová
Hanka .... Kateřina Lišková
Teacher's Younger Zajíček .... Miloslav Krejsa
Hatchet man Braha .... Pavel Prudil
Fiddler Zima .... Josef Smrčka
Fiddler Sejtko .... Luboš Lepič
Fiddler Klásek .... Václav Staněk
Mrs. Klásková .... Ladislava Ratajová
Michal, young waterman .... Antonín Kaška
Ivan, old waterman .... Josef Nechutný
Mr. Franc .... Jiří Beniške
Musketeer .... Jaroslav Luhan
Butler Jean .... Josef Hořký
Chamber-maid ..... Karolina Smržová
Reeve Kroužilka .... Miroslav Malík
Reeve Votruba ..... Karel Oupor
Satelloid .... Jitka Studená
Pastor .... Karel Žabka
Bridesmaid Lída .... Adéla Ratajová
Bridesmaid Bára .... Bohdana Křiklánová
Reeves, grooms .... Bařánice's Village

Divadelní spolek Jezírko, Křimice 
Directed by Jaroslav Pára. The play premiered 3 June 2002 and 4 June 2002.
Young Princess .... Ilona Černá, Klára Nedorostová
Gentleman .... Jiří Bartička
Suzerain .... Vlastimil Brabec, Jaroslav Pára
Miller .... Pavel Solnař
Granny .... Milada Drápalová, Petra Zoubková
Hanka .... Michaela Kunešová, Iva Malatová, Martina Párová
Teacher's Younger Zajíček .... Roman Horn, Marek Světlík
Hatchet man Braha .... Miloslav Nágr, Josef Růt
Fiddler Zima .... Robert Kunesch
Fiddler Sejtko .... Pavel Malata st.
Fiddler Klásek .... David Chyška
Mrs. Klásková .... Vladimíra Kurcová, Ivana Malatová
Michal, young waterman .... Jiří Laněk
Ivan, old waterman .... Josef Drápal
Mr. Franc .... Radek Jansa
Musketeer .... Ivo Hýbl, Ladislav Synek
Reeves, grooms .... Roman Horn, Miloslav Nágr, j.h., Josef Růt, Marek Světlík
Owls .... Eliška Dolejšová, Július Novák
Queen of Nymphs .... Hana Rendlová, Romana Strnadová
nymphs of Mothers Earth .... Veronika Jíchová, Petra Karásková, Veronika Kučerová, Michaela Kunešová, Lucie Niklová, Věra Niklová

National Theatre, Prague 
Directed by Vladimír Morávek. This production premiered 7 October 2008. 
Young Princess .... Sabina Králová, Taťjana Medvecká
Gentleman .... Jan Novotný
Suzerain .... Václav Postránecký
Miller .... David Matásek, Petr Motloch
Granny .... Vlasta Chramostová, Ljuba Skořepová
Hanka .... Barbora Poláková
Zajíček .... Jan Hartl
Braha .... Petr Pelzer
Zima .... Pavel Vondruška, Oldřich Vlček
Sejtko .... Karel Pospíšil
Klásek .... Bronislav Poloczek, Alois Švehlík
Klásková .... Iva Janžurová, Jana Boušková, Jitka Smutná
Michal .... Vojtěch Dyk
Ivan .... František Němec
Mr. Franc .... Vladislav Beneš
Jean .... Miloš Nesvadba, Filip Rajmont
Musketeer .... Alexej Pyško
Chamber-maid .... Jitka Smutná, Marika Skopalová
Kroužilka .... Milan Stehlík
Votruba .... Václav Bouška

External links 
Akaska.cz (Czech)
Reader's Diary (Czech)
National Theatre (Czech)
Czechoslovak Film Database

Comedy plays
Czech plays
1905 plays